This is a list of current and defunct Spanish automobiles, listed by manufacturer.

Current companies 
 Aspid
 Beulas (Bus & Coach)
 Comarth (Electric Vehicles)
 Hurtan
 Irizar (Bus & Coach)
 Mazel (Concept Cars)
 SEAT
 124
 127
 128
 131
 132
 133
 600
 800
 850
 1200
 1400
 1430
 1500
 Alhambra
 Altea
 Altea XL / Freetrack
 Arosa
 Ateca
 Córdoba
 Exeo
 Fura
 Ibiza
 Inca
 León
 Málaga
 Marbella
 Ronda
 Terra
 Toledo
 Trans
 Tauro (Sports Cars)
 Tramontana (Sports Cars)
 Uro (trucks) (Civil/Military Trucks)

Defunct companies

A-D 

 Abadal (1912–1923; 1930)
 AFA (1943–1944)
 America (1917–1922)
 A
 B
 C
 D
 Anglada (1902–1905)
 Castro
 Tobajas
 Ultramovil
 Authi (1966–1976)
 Mini
 Mini 850
 Mini 1000-E
 Mini 1000-S
 Mini Cooper 1300
 Mini Van
 Morris 1100
 Morris Traveller
 Avia (1956-1980s)
 2500
 3500
 Barreiros (1951–1969)
 Cóndor
 Panter
 Puma
 Simca 1000 automático
 Simca 1000 GT
 Simca 1000 Rallye Gr2
 Simca 1200 GLS (90 octanos)
 Simca 1200 campero
 Star
 Biscuter (1953–1958)
 200 C
 Pegasin
 Ceyc (1923–1931)
 Clúa (1959–1960)

E-I 

 Electric vehicles, with Trojan batteries: (1914-1965)
 Cross Rider 
 Model TS    
 Dagsa (1954–1955)
 David (1914–1922; 1951–1957)
 Torpedo 2.5
 Torpedo 2 S
 Diaz y Grilló (1914–1922)
 Ebro (1954-1980s)
 C 550
 F-108
 El Fénix (1901–1904)
 Elizalde (1914–1928)
 11
 20
 29
 48
 España (1917–1928)
 Eucort (1946–1953)
 Eucort rural
 Sedán 3 cilindros
 Victoria Avión
 Victoria Rubia
 Victoria Sedán
 Hispano Aleman (1970–1976)
 Hispano-Guadalajara (1918–1923)
 Hispano-Suiza (1904–1968)
 Hisparco (1924–1929)
 Ideal (1915–1922)
 IPV (1963-2006)
 Izaro (1922-19??)

J-Z 

 Kapi (1950–1955)
 Ampurias
 Barcino
 Chiqui
 Kapiscooter
 Jip
 M190
 Platillo Volante
 Tarraco
 Turisa
 La Cuadra (1898–1902)
 Landa (1919–1931)
 M.A. Alvarez (????-????)
 Matas/SRC (1917–1925)
 Nacional G (1939–1940)
 Nacional Pescara (1929–1932)
 Nike (1917–1919)
 Orix (1952–1954)
 Otro Ford (1922–1924)
 Pegaso (1951–1957)
 Pegaso I
 Pegaso II (Z-202)
 Pegaso Diesel (Z-203)
 Z-102
 Z-103
 Z-207
 Z-403
 Z-501
 352
 3020
 3045
 3050
 3545 BLR
 3550 VAP
 3560 BMR
 3562 VEC
 5070
 DAF 95
 Monotral
 P.T.V. (1956–1962)
 Ricart-Pérez (1922–1926)
 Ricart (1926–1928)
 Ricart-España (1928–1930)
 Santana (1956-2011)
 300
 Aníbal
 Sava (1957-1980s)
 TH (1915–1922)
 Triver (1953-1984)
 TZ (1956-1969)
 Victoria (1919–1924)

See also

List of automobile manufacturers
List of car brands
List of motorcycle manufacturers
List of truck manufacturers

 
Spain
Automobiles
Lists of automobile manufacturers